George Frederick Turnbull (4 February 1927 – 2002) was an English professional footballer who played as a goalkeeper.

References

1927 births
2002 deaths
Footballers from Gateshead
English footballers
Association football goalkeepers
Alnwick Town A.F.C. players
Grimsby Town F.C. players
Accrington Stanley F.C. (1891) players
Gateshead F.C. players
English Football League players